Ruth Williams (1926–2005) was a baseball pitcher.

Ruth Williams may also refer to:
 Ruth J. Williams, American statistician
 Ruth Williams (badminton) (born 1989), Jamaican badminton player
 Ruth C. Williams (1897–1962), Australian writer for children
 Ruth Margaret Williams, British mathematician
 Ruth Williams Cupp (1928–2016), American lawyer and legislator
 Ruth Williams Khama (1923–2002), First Lady of Botswana from 1966 to 1980
 Ruth Williams-Simpson (born 1949), Jamaican sprinter
 Ruth Williams, character in 1940 American film noir Babies for Sale

See also
 Linda Ruth Williams (born 1961), professor of film studies